Donna Marie Vivino is an American theatre, television, film actress and singer. She is well known for playing Elphaba in the Broadway production of Wicked and as the original Young Cosette in Les Misérables on Broadway. She was seen on Law & Order in January 2023 as guest star Rachel Ford. She will be appearing in the upcoming films "Family Affair" and "Inappropriate Behavior" with Bobby Cannavale. 

She is the niece of Floyd Vivino (aka "Uncle Floyd") and the daughter of Terri Vivino-Apgar and Jerry Vivino, a member of the Jimmy Vivino and the Basic Cable Band. Vivino was raised in Fair Lawn, New Jersey, where she attended Fair Lawn High School, and graduated from Barnard College of Columbia University in New York City. She is the sister of brothers Danny Vivino, Michael Vivino and sisters Antonia and Natalia. She has one child Hendrix.

Career

Beautiful Dreamer
Vivino's "Beautiful Dreamer" travels through personal history and musical eras. This recording features 13 songs that have resonated with Donna since childhood and embody her various interpretations of a “dream” – making her solo debut a thematically cohesive song-cycle, one that unfailingly captivates with its bountiful charms.
Donna is accompanied by a world-class jazz quartet led by her father Jerry Vivino – longtime member of Conan O'Brien's house band – and pianist/arranger Mitch Forman. She interprets songs by Rodgers and Hart, George and Ira Gershwin, Antônio Carlos Jobim, Randy Newman, and other legendary writers. Below is the track list:

1. When Day Is Done
2.Bewitched, Bothered and Bewildered
3. Over The Rainbow
4. When She Loved Me
5. Castle On A Cloud
6. Rainy Days and Mondays
7. How Insensitive
8. Never Never Land
9. My Romance
10. I Wish You Love
11. Once You Lose Your Heart
12. They Can't Take That Away From Me
13. Beautiful Dreamer

All songs performed by Vivino, arrangements by Mitchel Forman. Featuring Jerry Vivino (father) on flute, alto flute, tenor saxophone and clarinet; Mitchel Forman on piano and keyboards; Kevin Axt on upright bass and acoustic bass guitar; and Ray Brinker on drums and percussion. The album is available on iTunes, Amazon, and Sh-K-Boom Records.

Stars of David
Vivino performed in Stars Of David, which opened November 12, 2013 at the Daryl Roth Theatre. The show ran until December 15, and Donna was seen in roles such as Mandy, Ruth Ginsburg and Fran Drescher.

Wicked
Vivino played a 20-month stint as Elphaba on the 1st U.S. tour of the smash-hit musical Wicked. She joined the tour on October 30, 2007, serving as the standby for Carmen Cusack. Her first ever performance took place on December 26, 2007, and her first in the lead role on November 5, 2008. She starred alongside Katie Rose Clarke and later Chandra Lee Schwartz as Glinda. Her final performance took place on July 4, 2010. On August 23, 2011, Donna took over the position of Elphaba standby on Broadway, replacing Jennifer DiNoia. She first covered during the absence of lead Teal Wicks on the matinee of September 14. Jackie Burns replaced Wicks once her contract ended. Incidentally, Burns was Vivino's replacement on the national tour. Vivino was re-united with Clarke (who reprises her lead role) while performing as standby. Vivino went on for Burns the last two weeks of Burns' contract while she was suffering from the flu. She then went on as the Elphaba standby for Willemijn Verkaik and then for Lindsay Mendez. She left the show on November 3, 2013.

Theatre credits

Broadway
Wicked as Elphaba standby (August 23, 2011 – November 3, 2013)
Martin Short: Fame Becomes Me as Comedy All-Star (2006)
Hairspray as Shelley and understudy Tracy Turnblad (2006)
Saturday Night Fever in the ensemble
Les Misérables, Original Broadway Cast, as Young Cosette (1987–88)

--National Tour--
'Wicked" as Elphaba (November 2008 - August 2010)
'Cats' as Grizabella (January 2020 - March 2020) -- closed due to the COVID-19 pandemic

Vivino also originated the role of Enid Hoopes in all of the pre-Broadway workshops of Legally Blonde but was unable to do the show because of scheduling conflicts with Martin Short: Fame Becomes Me.

Off-Broadway
 'Guys and Dolls" as Miss Adelaide
 “Next to Normal “ as Diana Goodman 
 “Merrily We Roll Along” as Mary Flynn (LA Ovation Award Nomination for Best Actress in a Musical) (Robby Award Winner - Best Actress in a Musical)
 “Finks” as Natalie (SF Bay Area Theatre Critics Award Nomination for Best Actress in a Play)
Stars Of David, as Mandy, Ruth Ginsburg, and Fran Drescher
Sleeping Beauty Wakes, as Cheryl Dourado
Grease, as Rizzo
The Opposite Of Sex, as Bobette Kulp
A... My Name Is Alice, Woman #2
Joseph and the Amazing Technicolor Dreamcoat, as Narrator

National tours
Cats, National, as Grizabella (2020)Wicked, 1st national, as Elphaba (November 5, 2008 – July 2010)Wicked, 1st national, as Elphaba standby (October 3, 2007 – November 4, 2008)Hairspray, 1st national, as Shelley (2003–04)

Workshops and readings
Bedwetter, as Beth AnnLegally Blonde, as Enid HoopsDancing Under Water, as Girl Next DoorTerezin, as LoreleiTarzan, as StorytellerOwl Creek, as Shiloh

Television and film
 Law and Order *, Rachel Ford, 2023
 Family Affair *, Beverly, 2023 
 Good Friday, Emily Cole, 2015
 Subject, Drink Girl, 2015 (short)
 Submissions Only, Serena Maxwell, 2012/14, 11 episodes 
 A Gifted Man, Rhonda, 1 episode, 2012
 My Sassy Girl, Woman of No Consequence #2, 2008
 Everyday People, Samel's Caseworker, 2004
 The Twelve Days of Christmas, Princess Silverbell (voice), TV movie, 1993
 Married to It, Lucy Rothenberg, 1991
 American Playwrights Theater: The One Acts, Mary Sweeney, 1 episode, 1989
 All My Children, Young Erica Kane, 1 episode, 1988
 ABC Afterschool Specials, Kendall Bard, 1 episode, 1987
 Late Night With David Letterman, Self, 1 episode, 1987
 Hometown'', Tess Abbott, 1 episode, 1985

References

External links
Donna Vivino's official website

American child actresses
American film actresses
American musical theatre actresses
American stage actresses
American television actresses
Barnard College alumni
Living people
Fair Lawn High School alumni
People from Fair Lawn, New Jersey
1978 births
Actresses from New Jersey
American web series actresses
21st-century American actresses
20th-century American actresses